Michael E. Uslan (born June 2, 1951) is an American lawyer and film producer. Uslan has also dabbled in writing and teaching, he is known for being the first instructor to teach an accredited course on comic book folklore at any university.

Early life
Uslan was born in Bayonne, New Jersey and was an avid comic book collector from a very young age, owning a collection that included the second issue of Batman and the first Superman comic, among others. He grew up in Ocean Township, Monmouth County, New Jersey and graduated from Ocean Township High School in 1969, by which time his collection filled the garage of his home with 30,000 comic books. A fan of the darkness inherent in the Batman comics, he was dismayed by the campy portrayal of the character in the '60s television series, which was at the height of its popularity during Uslan's teen years. While still an undergraduate and a graduate at the same time at Indiana University School of Law – Bloomington, attempting to break into the film industry by sending off over 300 résumés, Uslan "developed a course idea for the Experimental Curriculum program at IU".

Career

Teaching
Uslan recalls that Roger Stern "has been teaching a one-hour credit experimental course on comic book history and art," while he (Uslan) was "having fun with an I.U. Free University course on 'The Comic Book Hero'." Stern and Uslan discovered they shared interests, and when Stern "couldn't stand teaching the course any longer," Uslan took it over and changed it into one that took "an academic approach to the comics, divided into its history, folklore, art, sociology, psychology, and literary/educational value. Looking at their stages of relevancy and fantasy, the many aspects of censorship, their effects on other media, penciling and inking styles, their psychological implications, current and future trends, and the role of comics in school systems."

Uslan intended that his course on comics gives students the full three hours of college credit, on a par with "history, physics, or chemistry." In order to be eligible to teach the course as an undergraduate, Uslan found a sponsor in Henry Glassie, a professor in the Department of Folklore, who saw superheroes as the logical descendant to Norse, Egyptian and Greek mythology.

The Dean of the College of Arts and Sciences challenged the nature of Uslan's course, but gave his approval. Uslan's course, by then-titled "The Comic Book in Society," thus became "the first accredited course on the serious study of comic books."

Uslan won fame for his comic book class by anonymously calling a local newspaper reporter and complaining about the course. TV crews filmed the first five meetings of the course, by then called "The Comic Book in America," including John Chancellor's NBC News. Intending to invite different speakers each semester, Uslan found that Denny O'Neil was voted for by the class so often that he became the regular invitee (Uslan notes that Bob Rozakis was among those passed over in favor of O'Neil).

Press coverage led to Uslan being invited to lecture at a number of colleges and high schools, as well as participate in talk shows on radio and TV (his first television appearance was alongside writers Steve Englehart and Gerry Conway). It also led to phone calls from Stan Lee, and eventually to a job offer from DC Comics. Uslan wrote a textbook dealing with his course, The Comic Book in America (Indiana University, 1971).

Writing
Uslan attempted his first comics writing in 1975 at DC Comics' version of The Shadow and publishing competitor Charlton Comics' Charlton Bullseye. He also wrote a comic-book adaptation of Beowulf for DC Comics in 1975.  He wrote some Batman comics before moving on to motion pictures.

He initiated  Stan Lee's Just Imagine... and contributed short stories with renowned artists like John Severin, Gene Colan and Richard Corben to it.

He wrote some The Spirit comics, before producing the feature film.

With only some brief (foreword) writing and editing stints in between, Uslan scripted the 2009 six-part story, Archie Marries Veronica.

2011 saw the publication of his autobiography, The Boy Who Loved Batman. Uslan then wrote the foreword to the 2012 Wiley & Sons book Batman and Psychology: A Dark and Stormy Knight, by Dr. Travis Langley. In 2021, it was announced that The Boy Who Loved Batman would be adapted into a Broadway play titled Darknights and Daydreams.

Movie pitches and film rights ownership
Due to Uslan's prior work at DC Comics he became a hands-on producer during the filming of Swamp Thing and The Return of Swamp Thing.

Uslan is a film rights holder with Benjamin Melniker's estate, the pair are credited as "executive producers" on all of Warner Bros. Batman films to up to Melniker's death in 2018, starting with Tim Burton's 1989 film, and continuing to The Batman and also including various direct-to-video feature-length films, including those based on Batman: The Animated Series and The Batman. Uslan and Melniker were executive producers on the Swamp Thing TV series and 2008's The Spirit film, among others), Uslan has "produced a surprisingly diverse list of film and television."

Other credits
These include Three Sovereigns for Sarah (1985), starring Vanessa Redgrave, part of the American Playhouse series on PBS dealing with the Salem Witch Trials and the children's geography-teaching TV show Where on Earth Is Carmen Sandiego?.

Uslan created and co-produced the 1980s cartoon Dinosaucers and wrote a few episodes on the series. Uslan and Melniker were also associate producers on Disney's National Treasure.

He was hired to advise Genius Brands on the use of Stan Lee Universe IP in July 2020.

Charity and other work
In 2005, Uslan donated his 30,000 comic book collection to Indiana University's Lilly Library (rare books and manuscripts library), a collection which (according to his wife Nancy) "filled three rooms of their house." Uslan was the honorary speaker at the 2006 Indiana University commencement ceremonies, held on May 6, 2006. Uslan was the honorary speaker at the 2012 Westfield State University commencement ceremonies, held on May 19, 2012.

Awards
With his co-executive producers, Uslan won a 1995 Daytime Emmy for Where on Earth Is Carmen Sandiego?, and he was also awarded an Independent Spirit Award at the 2005 Garden State Film Festival. In 2011, he was awarded the Lifetime Achievement Award by the Peace River Film Festival. On October 10, 2012 he received an Honorary Doctorate of Fine Arts from Monmouth University in West Long Branch, New Jersey. That same year he was awarded the Inkpot Award.

Personal life
Uslan has been a resident of Cedar Grove, New Jersey. He is married to Nancy Uslan.

References

External links 

1951 births
American comics writers
Comics scholars
Indiana University Maurer School of Law alumni
Inkpot Award winners
Living people
Ocean Township High School alumni
People from Cedar Grove, New Jersey
People from Ocean Township, Monmouth County, New Jersey
Writers from Bayonne, New Jersey